George Rudicel Polygonal Barn is a historic 12-sided barn located in Noble Township, Shelby County, Indiana, USA. It was built in 1910 and is a two-story, vernacular frame barn. It is topped by a cone roof with a large dormer and square cupola.

It was listed on the National Register of Historic Places in 1993.

References

Round barns in Indiana
Barns on the National Register of Historic Places in Indiana
Buildings and structures completed in 1910
Buildings and structures in Shelby County, Indiana
National Register of Historic Places in Shelby County, Indiana